Bear Peak may refer to:


United States
Bear Peak (Lake County, California)
Bear Peak (Siskiyou County, California)
Bear Peak (Boulder County, Colorado)
Bear Peak (Custer County, Colorado)
Bear Peak (Blaine County, Idaho)
Bear Peak (Montana), a mountain in Flathead County, Montana
Bear Peak, a mountain peak that is part of the Mountain Creek ski resort in Sussex County, New Jersey
Bear Peak, a mountain peak that is part of the Attitash Mountain Resort in Bartlett, New Hampshire
Bear Peak, in the San Augustin Mountains of New Mexico
Bear Peak (Wyoming)

Other places
Bear Peak (Greenland), in the Stauning Alps

See also
 Little Bear Peak, Chouteau County, Montana
 Polar Bear Peak, Alaska
 Bear Mountain (disambiguation)

References